Kirkhaugh or Kirkheugh may refer to:
Kirkhaugh, a village in Northumberland, England
Church of St Mary on the Rock, St Andrews, Scotland, also known as St Mary of the Culdees, Kirkheugh and Church of St Mary of Kilrymont